The 2014 European Championship was the 13th European Championship of American football. The competition was held in Austria between May 30 and June 7, 2014. The top three teams qualified for the 2015 IFAF World Championship.

Qualification
Since 2003, the European Championships have been held in three different stages, with the winners of the C- and B-Pool tournaments each being promoted to the next-highest level. The winner of the C-Pool tournament in 2012 was Serbia. The B-Pool tournament 2013 took place from August 31 to September 7 in Milan, Italy. In addition to Italy and Serbia, there was also Denmark, Spain, the Czech Republic and Great Britain that battled for a spot in the A-Pool for 2014 in Austria. The winner was Denmark, which qualified for the A-pool in 2014.

Teams
Group A
 (2010 champion)

Group B
 (2010 Runner-up)
 (Host)
 (2013 B-Pool Winner)

Venues
Below is a list of the venues which hosted games during the 2014 EFAF European Championship. Each preliminary round group was hosted in a single arena in St. Pölten (Group A) and Graz (Group B). The knockout phase and Finals took place at Ernst-Happel-Stadion in Vienna.

Group stages

Group A

Standings

Schedule

Group B

Standings

Schedule

Final stage

5th place

3rd Place

1st Place

See also
IFAF Europe

References

External links

European Championship of American football
European Championship
E
2014 in Austrian sport
American football in Austria
Sport in Graz
Sankt Pölten
Sports competitions in Vienna
2010s in Vienna
May 2014 sports events in Europe
June 2014 sports events in Europe